Ankitkar Jaiswal (born 22 July 2001) is an Indian cricketer. He made his Twenty20 debut on 12 January 2021, for Odisha in the 2020–21 Syed Mushtaq Ali Trophy.

References

External links
 

2001 births
Living people
Indian cricketers
Odisha cricketers
People from Rourkela
Cricketers from Odisha